USS Ogeechee (AOG-35) was a Mettawee-class gasoline tanker acquired by the U.S. Navy for the dangerous task of transporting gasoline to warships in the fleet, and to remote Navy stations.

Ogeechee was laid down 7 May 1944 by the East Coast Ship Yard, Inc., Bayonne, New Jersey. under a Maritime Commission contract; acquired by the Navy 31 August 1944; commissioned 6 September 1944.

World War II service 
 
Manned by U.S. Coast Guard personnel, Ogeechee conducted shakedown operations in Chesapeake Bay, then departed for Aruba, Netherlands West Indies, where she took on a full cargo of diesel oil 6 November.

Pacific Ocean Alaskan operations 

Transiting the Panama Canal 13 November, she proceeded via San Diego, California, to Seattle, Washington, where she discharged her cargo and where she underwent alterations and repairs for operations in the turbulent weather of the Aleutian Chain. After taking on her first cargo of gasoline, she departed Seattle 17 January 1945 for Adak, Alaska via the inland passage, Kodiak Island, and Dutch Harbor. She delivered her cargo to Attu Island then for the next several months continued to shuttle gasoline from the major tank farm facilities at Sand Bay, Alaska to Army and Navy bases west of Dutch Harbor.

End-of-war decommissioning 

Ogeechee departed Kodiak 10 November for San Francisco, California, where she arrived 19 November to begin the procedure that resulted in decommissioning 18 February 1946. She was stricken from the Naval Register 12 March then transferred to the Maritime Commission and sold 1 July. She was scrapped in 1964.

References

External links 
 

 

Mettawee-class gasoline tankers
Type T1-M-A2 tankers of the United States Navy
Ships built in Bayonne, New Jersey
1944 ships
World War II auxiliary ships of the United States